is a Japanese voice actor affiliated with maxmix.

Filmography

Television animation
Genji Tsūshin Agedama (1991) (Suzuki)
Aoki Densetsu Shoot! (1994) (Sawaguchi, Katsuhisa Takahashi)
Tottemo! Luckyman (1994) (Superstarman)
Jura Tripper (1995) (O-Taku)
Fushigi Yûgi (1995) (Tomite)
Romeo's Blue Skies (1995) (Benalibo Marco)
Neon Genesis Evangelion (1995) (Kensuke Aida)
El-Hazard (1995) (Makoto Mizuhara)
Wild Knights Gulkeeva (1995) (Shinjou Touya)
Slayers (1995) (Hallas Ryzu)
H2 (1996) (Tetsu Sagawa)
Virtua Fighter (1996) (Lion Rafale)
Chūka Ichiban! (1997) (Tan Sanche)
Fancy Lala (1998) (Imaichi)
Gasaraki (1998) (Jun Kitazawa)
Princess Nine (1998) (Seishiro Natsume)
St. Luminous Mission High School (1998) (Kaihei Kijima)
Haré+Guu (2001) (Wiggle)
s-CRY-ed (2001) (Asuka Tachibana)
Yu-Gi-Oh! Duel Monsters (2001) (Marik Ishtar)
Crush Gear Turbo (2002) (Sean Firestone)
Ghost in the Shell: Stand Alone Complex (2003) (J·D)
Tsubasa Chronicle (2006) (Souseki)
Detective Conan (2006) (Hidehiko Nakazato)
Angelique (2007) (Sei-lan)
Kaiba (2008) (Kichi, Bori, Kera)
Puella Magi Madoka Magica (2011) (Tomohisa Kaname)

OVA
El-Hazard (1995) (Makoto Mizuhara)
Birdy the Mighty (1996) (Tsutomu Senkawa)
Rurouni Kenshin: Trust & Betrayal (1999) (Kiyosato Akira)
Locke the Superman: Mirror Ring (2000) (Lan Svensen)

Theatrical animation
Memories (1995) (Nobuo's Younger Brother)
Crayon Shin-chan: Pursuit of the Balls of Darkness (1997) (Gorobe)
Crayon Shin-chan: Explosion! The Hot Spring's Feel Good Final Battle (1999) (Killer Joe Finger)
Crayon Shin-chan: The Storm Called The Jungle (2000) (Navigator)
Evangelion: 1.0 You Are (Not) Alone (2007) (Kensuke Aida)
Evangelion: 2.0 You Can (Not) Advance (2009) (Kensuke Aida)
s-CRY-ed Alteration Tao (2011) (Asuka Tachibana)
Puella Magi Madoka Magica Part 1: Beginnings (2012) (Tomohisa Kaname)
Puella Magi Madoka Magica Part 2: Eternal (2012) (Tomohisa Kaname)
Evangelion: 3.0+1.0 Thrice Upon a Time (2021) (Kensuke Aida)

Tokusatsu
Chōriki Sentai Ohranger (1995) (Bara Pino-killer (ep. 14))

Video games
Street Fighter series (xxxx-xx) (Ken Masters)
Angelique (xxxx) (Seiran)
Neon Genesis Evangelion: Girlfriend of Steel (xxxx) (Kensuke Aida)
Neon Genesis Evangelion: Girlfriend of Steel 2nd (xxxx) (Kensuke Aida)
Namco x Capcom (xxxx) (Ken Masters and Guy)
Street Fighter Alpha series (xxxx-xx) (Guy)
Valkyrie Profile (xxxx) (Kashel, Roy & Roland)
Valkyrie Profile: Lenneth (xxxx) (Kashel, Roy & Roland)
Fushigi Yūgi Genbu Kaiden Gaiden: Kagami no Miko (xxxx) (Tomite)
Ikemen Genjiden: Ayakashi koi enishi (2022) (Sutokuin/Akihito)

Drama CDs

3 Ji Kara Koi wo Suru series 4: Gozen 0 Ji Ai no Sasayaki (Ryoutarou Fujishiba)
3 Ji Kara Koi wo Suru series 6 (crossover with Analyst no Yuutsu series): Ai to Yokubou no Kinyuugai (Ryoutarou Fujishiba)
Abunai Series 2: Abunai Summer Vacation (Izumi Sudou)
Abunai Series 4: Abunai Campus Love (Shino Nanba)
Abunai Series side story 1: Abunai Ura Summer Vacation (Izumi Sudou)
 Analyst no Yuutsu series 2: Koi no Risk wa Hansenai  (Ryoutarou Fujishiba)
 Analyst no Yuutsu series 4 (crossover with 3 Ji Kara Koi wo Suru series): Ai to Yokubou no Kinyuugai (Ryoutarou Fujishiba)
Fushigi Yūgi Genbu Kaiden (Chamuka Tan - Tomite)
Hello!! Doctor (Yuuya Mizushima)
Kiken ga Ippai (Tanaka)
Muteki na Anoko (Tamoo Tateno)
Otawamure wo Prince (Touru Enami)
Soryamou Aideshou series 1  & 2 (Muzuki Kurokawa)
Tokyo Junk 1 & 2 (Masaki Okamoto)

Dubbing

Live-action
Growing Pains (Michael Aaron "Mike" Seaver (Kirk Cameron))
Hackers (Joey Pardella (Jesse Bradford))
Indiana Jones and the Last Crusade (Young Indiana Jones (River Phoenix))
The Deep End of the Ocean (Vincent Cappadora (Jonathan Jackson))

Animation
Invasion America (Jim Bailey)
Tarzan (Flynt)
Transformers: Beast Wars (Airazor)
X-Men (Leech)

References

External links
 
Official blog

Living people
Japanese male video game actors
Japanese male voice actors
Year of birth missing (living people)